Vyacheslav Mikhailovich "Slava" Zaitsev (born 2 March 1938) is a Russian fashion designer, painter, graphic artist and theatrical costume designer.

Early life 
Zaitsev was born on 2 March 1938 in Ivanovo to Mikhail Yakovlevich Zaitsev and Maria Ivanovna Zaitseva. His father was a victim of the repressions of Joseph Stalin and was incarcerated in one of Stalin's camps, and his mother was a cleaner and laundress. From 19451952 he studied Secondary School № 22 in Ivanovo. As his father was deemed by the State to be an Enemy of the people, Zaitsev was denied the opportunity to study at an industrial academy, a theatrical school and a pilot training school.

In 1952 he began studies in the Faculty of Applied Arts at the University of Chemistry and Technology in Ivanovo, and during this time he became interested in manufacturing and received the credentials to become a textile artist. He graduated, with honours, from the university in 1956. After realising that working with textiles was his dream, he moved to Moscow in 1956, and commenced studies at the Moscow Textile Institute, from which he graduated in 1962 with a Bachelor's degree in painting and designing. Whilst he was studying at the Institute, he married Marina Vladimirovna Zaitseva in 1959, and fathered a son, Yegor Vyacheslavovich Zaitsev, in 1960.

Career

Career in the Soviet Union 

During the Soviet era, clothing was dominated by Zaitsev and Valentin Yudashkin, and he was compared to other world-renowned fashion designers such as Christian Lacroix, Christian Dior, Pierre Cardin, and Yves Saint Laurent, Zaitsev was seen as being to compete with Western designers, however, under the communist regime, the only country outside of the USSR where Zaitsev was able to work was Czechoslovakia. Alexandre Vassiliev, a Russian-born, Paris-based fashion historian and designer, stated that "(i)f he had had a chance to show his collections abroad he would have been most possibly a world-famed brand."

In March 1962, he began work as the artistic director of «Experimental technical garment factory «Mosoblsovnarkhoza», where he oversaw production of women's clothing for retail stores in Moscow and the surrounding region. Zaitsev came to attention in 1963 when he designed a chic version of the telogreika, Pavlovsky Posad shawl-inspired skirts and multi-coloured valenki for kolkhoz workers. Whilst his creations were lauded by the authorities for "sparkling with all colours of the rainbow", his collection was not approved for production by the Methodical Council. In February 1963, Paris Match became the first foreign media outlet to profile Zaitsev, and highly rated his collection.

In March 1965 Zaitsev became the Chief Designer at the All-Union Fashion House, which was also known as Dom Modeli, on Kuznetsky Most. In April 1965 Pierre Cardin, Marc Bohan (then with Dior) and Guy Laroche visited Moscow and became familiar with Zaitsev's works, although Zaitsev wasn't present, and was covered in an article of Paris Match. Pierre Cardin called Zaitsev an "equal among equals", and the French press dubbed him the Red Dior Between 19651968 Zaitsev's works, dubbed the Russian series, were displayed abroad.

He resigned from the All-Union Fashion House in 1978, and began to work out of a small studio. His mother, with whom he had a great affinity died in the same year, and after her death he took up the writing of poetry. Zaitsev designed a collection of costumes for the Soviet team for the 1980 Summer Olympics which were held in Moscow, for which he was awarded the Order of the Badge of Honor. He authored two books in 1980, "Such Changeable Fashion" and "This Multifaceted World of Fashion", which were republished in Bulgaria and Czechoslovakia in 1983.

In 1982 he transformed his studio into the «Slava Zaitsev» Moscow Fashion House, also known as Dom Modi, becoming the first Soviet couturier who was permitted by the Soviet Government to label his own clothing. By the mid-1980s, Dom Modi employed 600 civil servants and was required to produce some 2 million roubles worth of clothing each year. In 1984 it was reported that Dom Modi had served 10,000 customers, and prices ranged from US$170 to US$260 for prêt-à-porter dresses, and up to US$1,000 for haute couture gowns. Zaitsev met with Thierry Mugler in 1985 in Moscow, and the French couturier photographed Zaitsev's fashions for an article in Paris Match.

Raisa Gorbachyova wore Zaitsev creations when she made what The New York Times described as a "perestroika splash" in the 1980s. Due to the patronage of the Soviet First Lady, he gained a reputation as one of the world's hottest fashion designers, and became an international celebrity in his own right and a household name in Russia. Zaitsev fashions were displayed at Expo '85 in Tsukuba, Japan, although it wasn't until 1986 when he was able to visit a capitalist country when he displayed some of his works in the Soviet pavilion at Expo 86 in Vancouver, British Columbia, Canada.

A member of the Communist Party of the Soviet Union, Zaitsev affirmed his belief in the Soviet Union and the future of communism, including the communist ideals of a workers' paradise. The New York Times reported that by the 1980s, he became disillusioned with the Party. Zaitsev told the newspaper that at mandatory party meetings he "began to defend the right to be free, as it says in the Communist charter. They constantly tried to distract me, not to let me get in. I'd be stuck in the elevator or I'd be sent off to some other event." This disillusionment led to Zaitsev quitting the party in the late 1980s.

Zaitsev often complained to the Soviet authorities about the lack of essential materials for his craft, which The New York Times noted in 1988 that he "until recently" was forced to use dressmaker's mannequins from World War II. Zaitsev signed a three-year contract with Intertorg Inc. in August 1987, which saw Dom Modi selling its designs in the United States, with profits going to the design house rather than the Soviet Treasury. The contract was the first commercial consumer venture signed between the two countries. In October 1987 he showed his collection at the iconic Waldorf-Astoria in New York City, which critics called overwrought, out-of-date and reminiscent of Western fashion from several seasons earlier. Undiscouraged, Zaitsev said that he planned to return with a "pared-down, sexier collection". He returned to New York City in 1988 where he designed costumes for the musical revue Sophisticated Ladies, based on the music of Duke Ellington. Participation in his first Paris fashion shows came in January 1988 at the invitation of Madame Carven, whom Zaitsev met in Moscow in December 1987, showing his collection under the banner of "Russian Seasons". He also joined the Maison de Couture and was made an honorary citizen of Paris, by then Mayor Jacques Chirac. The following year in March, Maison de Couture named Zaitsev as "Man of the Year in the World of Fashion"

In September 1989, Zaitsev showed his collections in West Germany for the first time under the theme "Fashion and Music Revue '90", and in December 1989 he won first prize at "Five top fashion designers in the world-90" in Tokyo, Japan, where he was competing against Donna Karan, Claude Montana, Hanae Mori and Byblos.

Career in Russia 
Whilst during the Soviet era Zaitsev's work was funded by the Soviet government, which as a state employee he earned the maximum of 1,000 roubles per month, after the collapse of the Soviet Union he became responsible for financing the business out of his private income, with New Russians making up the bulk of his clientele. In 1991 he designed a new uniform for the Russian police, and was bestowed the title of Honored Worker in the Field of the Arts. By 1992, Jane Fonda, Ted Turner and Herb Ritts were amongst celebrities who became customers of Zaitsev, and in the same year Zaitsev launched a women's perfume named Maroussia, in conjunction with French-based L'Oréal. The perfume which is classified as a floral oriental and is still in production, was launched in a few European countries in 1992 and was launched worldwide in 1993.

1992 was also a significant year in Zaitsev's career, because it was then that he presented for the first time his recent fashion collection, as well as his paintings and works on paper in prestigious venues, both in New York and in Beverly Hills. Never before was Russian fashion design demonstrated on the American runways, and never before were Zaitsev's most personal paintings and drawings allowed to be exhibited in the West. Fashion shows and exhibitions were held at the Bowles-Sorokko Galleries on both the East and the West Coasts, and they were widely attended, marking the beginning of cultural exchanges in the area of visual arts between the USA and the new Russia. According to Serge Sorokko, then president of the Bowles-Sorokko Galleries, Mr. Zaitsev was a lifelong painter, but was never free to exhibit publicly his art before. "[That was] because his work was outside the dogmas of socialist realism," Mr. Sorokko told The New York Times. "He was permitted to paint only for his own soul. When I visited his home in Moscow, I saw 20 years of pictorial work on his walls."

In 1994, Zaitsev hosted the inaugural Nadezhda Lamanova Prize competition for professional Russian designers at Dom Modi, and the competition has been held under his patronage since. In 1996 he launched a competition in Russia, using the slogan of "Goodbye Barbie, welcome Maroussia", to find the "purest essence of" female adolescence, with the aim of decreasing the influence of the American doll in Russia. In Zaitsev's words, "Barbie is rigid, cold, cynical, pragmatic. Now look at the faces of our children... they are not only beautiful, but sweet, charming and mysterious. In every face there's a secret, and so must the new Russian doll". Also in 1996, a follow-up to 1992s Maroussia, a floriental fragrance named Authentic Maroussia was launched but has since been discontinued.

Zaitsev was the tailor to Vladimir Zhirinovsky for his 1996 Russian presidential campaign. Zaitsev, who planned to vote for Boris Yeltsin, stated on Zhirinovsky, "He wanted something distinctly Russian, so I thought back to the military-style jackets of the 20s, the 30slike Stalin, only in new colours". On 27 May 1996, President of Russia Boris Yeltsin awarded Zaitsev the State Prize of the Russian Federation in the field of literature and the arts. In 1996, Zaitsev was also made an honorary citizen of the city of his birth, Ivanovo.

His 2001 collection entitled Dedication saw the most expensive dresses costing between $10,00012,000, whilst the cheapest were in the $2,0003,000 price range.

When then-President of Russia Vladimir Putin was due to travel on a state visit to the United Kingdom in June 2003, Zaitsev designed attire for First Lady of Russia Lyudmila Putina to wear for the visit, which included an audience with Queen Elizabeth II. Zaitsev told Zhizn that it took some time to convince Putina to wear a hat, due to Russian women in general not wearing them.

By February 2005, Zaitsev had opened 4 «Слава Зайцев. Men's wear» stores in Ryazan, Ufa, Orenburg and Samara. The New York Times described Zaitsev in 2004 as one of the few Soviet icons who is still an icon in modern-day Russia, and Time Magazine reported in 2007 that the Zaitsev name has 93% brand awareness in Russia. In 2007 Kommersant commissioned VCIOM to run a poll on public perception as to the make-up of the Russian elite; Zaitsev, who is often referred to as the Patriarch of Russian fashion, was rated at 74.

Zaitsev is not interested in achieving worldwide renown by showing his creations abroad, preferring to stay true to his Russian roots and encourages other Russian designers not to be influenced by the West. Zaitsev was quoted by Women's Wear Daily in April 2008 as saying:

In 2007 Zaitsev took part in the TV show "Fashion Sentence" on Channel One, in which he acted as a judge passing down sentence on contestant's fashion sense. After visiting Ashgabat in June 2008 for the Turkmen Textile Exhibition, Zaitsev stated that he was fascinated by traditional Turkmen clothing, and announced plans for a new collection which would incorporate traditional Turkmen elements. The casual wear collection is to be made exclusively from cotton from Turkmenistan and would feature the traditional Turkmen embroidery which captured his imagination. In September 2008, Zaitsev participated in "The Russian Evening-2008" at the Institute for International Political Studies in Milan, which was attended by Svetlana Medvedeva and Clio Maria Bittoni, the wife of Italian President Giorgio Napolitano.

Zaitsev has always been an admirer of the costumes sketches supplied by Pablo Picasso and Albert Benois, amongst others, for Sergei Diaghilev's Paris troupe, and to celebrate the 100th anniversary of Diaghilev's Ballets Russes, Zaitsev's collection for the 2009 Russian Fashion Week pays homage to the Russian ballet impresario.

The Eremitage in Sankt Petersburg honors since June 2016 Zaitsev's work with an extensive exhibition of his work. The new exhibition will be a big step toward creating a costume museum at the world-famous Eremitage. The exposition unveils many of the creations of the Slava Zaitsev Fashion House in Moscow over the past 30 years, along with clothing design sketches and the maestro's photos.

Style 

Zaitsev stated that his mother, Maria Ivanovna, was a cleaning lady and never owned a fancy dress. In 2004, the New York Times stated, "(i)t is her stolid image that he has been dressing all these years in flounces and feathers, poufs and peplums, gold and glitter." During the Soviet era, he regularly complained that he designed collections for the "larger" woman in the 1970s, but only models up to size 48 were accepted for production.

Whilst Zaitsev regards fashion designers Coco Chanel, Christian Dior, Gianfranco Ferré and Hubert de Givenchy as idols, his own creations are strongly influenced by traditional Russian and Slavic styles, and his collections include a variety of theme-based shows reflecting his take on the industry at the time. Past collections include the Millennium of the Christianisation of Russia in 1988; Russian Seasons in Paris in 1988; Agony of Perestroika in 1991; and Recollections of the Future in 19961997. In his creations, Zaitsev includes elements such as traditional Pavlovsky Posad shawls and embroidered quilted jackets, which have been featured in collections such as Expectation of Changes.

Dom Modi 

As of 2009, Dom Modi employs 500 people.

The activities of the fashion house and its participation in fashion weeks in different years were covered by the media: Fashion Collection, FashionTV Russia, Vogue Russia, Moda.ru, La Boheme Magazine and many others.

References

External links 

   Slava Zaitsev Moscow Fashion House
  Slava Zaitsev Model Agency
  Slava Zaitsev Fashion Lab
  Slava Zaitsev Fashion Lab

Russian fashion designers
20th-century Russian painters
Russian male painters
21st-century Russian painters
Russian graphic designers
Corresponding Members of the Russian Academy of Arts
Russian costume designers
State Prize of the Russian Federation laureates
People's Artists of Russia
Resigned Communist Party of the Soviet Union members
People from Ivanovo
1938 births
Living people
Russian television presenters
Moscow State Textile University alumni
Recipients of the Order "For Merit to the Fatherland", 4th class
Honorary citizens of Paris
20th-century Russian male artists
21st-century Russian male artists